Dead space or Dead Space may refer to:

Media
 Dead Space, a science fiction horror multimedia franchise
 Dead Space (2008 video game), a 2008 video game and inaugural title in the franchise
 Dead Space (2023 video game), a remake of the 2008 game
 Dead Space (mobile game), a 2011 third-person survival horror mobile game
 Dead Space (comics), a 2008 prequel comic book series
 Dead Space (novel), a 2021 science fiction novel
 Dead Space (film), a 1991 science-fiction film
 Dead Space (album), a 1994 album by Slowdown Virginia
 30 Days of Night: Dead Space, a comic book story

Region or gaseous environment
 Dead space (physiology), air that is inhaled but does not play a role in gas exchange
 Defilade or dead space, a space that cannot be engaged with direct fire in a military conflict
 A space that exists post-operatively in which fluid may accumulate and may require draining, such as with a Jackson-Pratt drain
 An excess space when using non-identical displays in Xinerama
 Mechanical dead space, the space in an external apparatus where both inhalation and exhalation pass through a common path

Other uses
 Dead Space Recording, a recording studio in Lincoln, Nebraska
 DeadSpace (DJ), a DJ

See also

 
 
 Dead zone (disambiguation)
 Dead (disambiguation)
 Space (disambiguation)